The Yellow Joss and Other Tales is a collection of short stories from Ion Idriess. They focus on life in North Australia.

References

External links
Yellow Joss at AustLit

1934 short story collections
Books by Ion Idriess
Australian short story collections
Angus & Robertson books